The Red Knoll School House is located off Red Knoll Road in Newberry County, South Carolina.

Red Knoll was a one room school house that was constructed in 1850 for grades 1-8.  The school was replaced by Little Mountain Elementary School in 1910.  A fire destroyed the building in 1914. The school house is still standing and is currently on private land.

References

Defunct schools in South Carolina
Buildings and structures in Newberry County, South Carolina